The Fisker Alaska is a full-size electric pickup truck being developed by Fisker Inc.

History
In February 2020, Fisker Inc. confirmed plans to expand its planned model range with a full-size electric pickup named Alaska. The appearance of the rear part of the body, reminiscent of the long and narrow lamps of the Ocean SUV, as well as the name was confirmed by Henrik Fisker himself via Twitter, later claiming that he added the entry accidentally, deleting it shortly after publication.

Production plans
As of September 2022, Fisker has not revealed a release date for the Alaska.

References

Electric concept cars
Electric trucks
Pickup trucks
Henrik Fisker
2020s cars